The 2009 European Parliament election in Ireland was the Irish component of the 2009 European Parliament election and was held on Friday, 5 June 2009, coinciding with the 2009 local elections. Two by-elections (Dublin South and Dublin Central) were also held on the same day.

National and regional summaries
The governing Fianna Fáil party lost one MEP and a significant share of the vote, in line with the day's other election results. Fine Gael increased its national vote share but lost a seat. The Labour Party, which increased its delegation from one MEP to three, was the only major party to make seat gains. Sinn Féin lost its only MEP in the Republic of Ireland, and the Socialist Party won a seat for the first time. One independent MEP lost her seat. The Green Party's vote was halved, and the pan-European Libertas party, based in Ireland, also failed to make a breakthrough.

In Dublin, Gay Mitchell of Fine Gael and Proinsias De Rossa of Labour were re-elected, while Joe Higgins of the Socialist Party defeated the incumbent Fianna Fáil and Sinn Féin MEPs to take the third seat. In the East constituency, Mairead McGuinness of Fine Gael and Liam Aylward of Fianna Fáil were re-elected. Nessa Childers of Labour took the vacant final seat. North-West re-elected independent ALDE MEP Marian Harkin and Jim Higgins of Fine Gael, while the Fianna Fáil seat was retained by former MEP Pat "the Cope" Gallagher. In South, Brian Crowley of Fianna Fáil was re-elected, Seán Kelly won a seat from his Fine Gael colleague Colm Burke, and Labour's Alan Kelly took the last seat in a tight contest between him, Sinn Féin's Toiréasa Ferris and the incumbent Independent Kathy Sinnott in the final count.

Constituency changes
In accordance with the terms of the Treaty of Nice, the number of MEPs from Ireland in the European Parliament was reduced from 13 to 12 for this election. The Dublin constituency was reduced from 4 seats to 3, and the counties of Longford and Westmeath were transferred from the East constituency to the North-West constituency. The election was conducted under the single transferable vote in Ireland; the only other constituencies to elect their MEPs under STV are Malta and Northern Ireland, with the rest of Europe using variants of the list system.

Results

MEPs elected

Voting details

See also
List of members of the European Parliament for Ireland, 2009–14 – List ordered by constituency

References

External links
 European Elections 2009 in Ireland
ElectionsIreland.org – 2009 European Parliament (Ireland) election results

European
European
Ireland
European Parliament elections in the Republic of Ireland